Water Branch is a  long 2nd order tributary to Richardson Creek in Union County, North Carolina.

Course
Water Branch rises in a pond about 1 mile west of Fountain Hill, North Carolina and then flows north to join Richardson Creek about 1.5 miles northeast of Olive Branch.

Watershed
Water Branch drains  of area, receives about 48.0 in/year of precipitation, has a wetness index of 389.10, and is about 36% forested.

References

Additional Maps

Rivers of North Carolina
Rivers of Union County, North Carolina